Philibert Guinier (21 June 1876 – 3 April 1962) was a French botanist.

1876 births
People from Grenoble
1962 deaths
20th-century French botanists
Members of the French Academy of Sciences